Brønnøysund Idrettslag is a Norwegian sports club from Brønnøysund, Nordland, founded on 1 September 1917. It has sections for association football, track and field, team handball, floorball, swimming, and gymnastics.

The men's football team currently plays in the Third Division, the fourth tier of Norwegian football. It last played in the Norwegian Second Division in 1999.

Former players include Tor Egil Horn, Bjørn Arve Lund and current Bodø/Glimt player Ulrik Saltnes.

References

 Official site 
 Official site football team 

Football clubs in Norway
Sport in Nordland
Association football clubs established in 1917
1917 establishments in Norway